Vermetus is a genus of sea snails, marine gastropod mollusks in the family Vermetidae, the worm snails or worm shells.

The genus Vermetus is very ancient: it occurs in the fossil record from the Jurassic to the Quaternary (age range: from 164.7 to 0.0 million years ago).

Species
Species within the genus Vermetus include:
 Vermetus adansonii Daudin, 1800
 Vermetus afer (Gmelin, 1791)
 Vermetus annulus Rousseau in Chenu, 1843
 Vermetus balanitintinnabuli Mörch, 1862
 Vermetus bieleri Scuderi, Swinnen & Templado, 2017
 Vermetus biperforatus Bieler, Collins, Golding & Rawlings, 2019 
 Vermetus brasiliensis Rousseau in Chenu, 1844
 Vermetus carinatus Quoy & Gaimard, 1834
 Vermetus dentiferus Rousseau in Chenu, 1844
 Vermetus enderli Schiaparelli & Metivier, 2000
 Vermetus eruca (Lamarck, 1818) (taxon inquirendum)
 Vermetus granulatus (Gravenhorst, 1831)
 Vermetus intestinalis (Gmelin, 1791) (taxon inquirendum)
 Vermetus periscopium Barnard, 1963
 Vermetus reticulatus Quoy & Gaimard, 1834
 Vermetus sansibaricus Thiele, 1925
 Vermetus tonganus Quoy & Gaimard, 1834
 Vermetus triquetrus Bivona Ant., 1832
 Vermetus turonius Rousseau in Chenu, 1844
 Vermetus vitreus Kuroda & Habe, 1972
Species brought into synonymy
 Vermetus alii Hadfield & Kay, 1972: synonym of Eualetes tulipa (Rousseau in Chenu, 1843) (subjective synonym)
 Vermetus annulatus Costa, 1861: synonym of Filogranula annulata (O. G. Costa, 1861)
 Vermetus calyculatus Costa, 1861: synonym of Filogranula calyculata (O. G. Costa, 1861)
 Vermetus cariniferus Gray, 1843: synonym of Spirobranchus carinifer (Gray, 1843)
 Vermetus centiquadrus Valenciennes, 1846: synonym of Eualetes centiquadrus (Valenciennes, 1846)
 Vermetus cristatus Biondi, 1857: synonym of Dendropoma petraeum
 Vermetus cyclicus Watson, 1886: synonym of Ctiloceras cyclicum (Watson, 1886)
 Vermetus gigas Bivona in Philippi, 1836: synonym of Serpulorbis arenarius
 Vermetus goreensis (Gmelin, 1791): synonym of Vermetidae incertae sedis goreensis (Gmelin, 1791)
 Vermetus indentatus (Carpenter, 1857): synonym of Thylaeodus indentatus (Carpenter, 1857)
 Vermetus knorrii Deshayes, 1843: synonym of Vermicularia knorrii (Deshayes, 1843)
 Vermetus masier Deshayes, 1843: synonym of Thylacodes masier (Deshayes, 1843) (original combination)
 Vermetus mutabilis Costa, 1861: synonym of Filogranula calyculata (O. G. Costa, 1861)
 Vermetus peronii Valenciennes, A., 1846: synonym of Eualetes centiquadrus (Valenciennes, 1846)
 Vermetus quadrangulus Philippi, 1848: synonym of Vermicularia spirata (Philippi, 1836)
 Vermetus quincunx Barnard, 1963: synonym of Stephopoma quincunx (Barnard, 1963)
 Vermetus quinquecostatus Daudin, 1800: synonym of Spirobranchus lima (Grube, 1862)
 Vermetus radilula Stimpson, 1851: synonym of Vermicularia radicula (Stimpson, 1851)
 Vermetus roseus Quoy & Gaimard, 1834: synonym of Stephopoma roseum (Quoy & Gaimard)
 Vermetus rugulosus Monterosato, 1878: synonym of Thylaeodus rugulosus (Monterosato, 1878) (original combination)
 Vermetus selectus (Monterosato, 1892): synonym of Thylacodes arenarius (Linnaeus, 1758)
 Vermetus semisurrectus Bivona Ant., 1832: synonym of Thylaeodus semisurrectus (Bivona-Bernardi, 1832) (original combination)
 Vermetus spiratus Philippi, 1836: synonym of Vermicularia spirata (Philippi, 1836)
 Vermetus tridentatus Daudin, 1800: synonym of Placostegus tridentatus (Fabricius, 1779)

References

 Gofas, S.; Le Renard, J.; Bouchet, P. (2001). Mollusca, in: Costello, M.J. et al. (Ed.) (2001). European register of marine species: a check-list of the marine species in Europe and a bibliography of guides to their identification. Collection Patrimoines Naturels, 50: pp. 180–213

External links
 Daudin, François Marie. (1800). Receuil de mémoires et de notes sur des espèces inédites ou peu connues de Mollusques, de vers et de zoophytes. xviii & 19-50. Fuchs & Treuttel et Wurtz. Paris
 Keen M. (1961). A proposed reclassification of the gastropod family Vermetidae. Bulletin of the British Museum, Natural History (Zoology), 7(3): 183-213, pls. 54-55
  Bieler, R.; Petit, R. E. (2011). Catalogue of Recent and fossil “worm-snail” taxa of the families Vermetidae, Siliquariidae, and Turritellidae (Mollusca: Caenogastropoda). Zootaxa. 2948, 1-103

Vermetidae
Callovian first appearances
Extant Middle Jurassic first appearances